Lykovrysi (formerly Γλυκόβρυση Glykovrysi) is in North Athens, Greece. Since the 2011 local government reform it is part of the municipality Lykovrysi-Pefki, of which it is a municipal unit/community.

Geography

Lykovrysi is located  11 km northeast of Athens city centre, east of the small river Kifisos. The municipal unit has an area of 1.950 km2. The built-up area of Lykovrysi is continuous with those of the neighbouring towns of Metamorfosi, Pefki and Irakleio. Greek National Road 1 passes through the town.

Τhere are two primary schools, the '1st and the 2nd Primary School of Lykovrysi', a gymnasium (junior high school), the '1st Gymnasium of Lykovrysi', a lyceum (senior high school), the '1st Lyceum of Lykovrysi', as well as St. Catherine's British Embassy School.

Historical population

Education
St.Catherine's British School in Athens is located in the town.

See also
List of municipalities of Attica

References

External links
City of Lykovrysi official website 

Populated places in North Athens (regional unit)